Assensbanen was a state-owned Danish railway line on Funen, between Tommerup Stationsby on the Funen Main Line and Assens. The line opened on 31 May 1884 and was closed to passenger traffic on 21 May 1966. After freight traffic had lost its importance, the Minister of Transport decided to close the line completely.

Trolley cycling
In the summer time, from  5 April to 21 October, it is now possible to ride the tracks the entire distance, about 30 km, on trolley cycles available for hire.

Possible starting points are Tommerup St., situated only 13 minutes by train from Odense, Glamsbjerg, situated 30 minutes by bus from Odense, and Assens situated 1 hour by bus from Odense.

Stations
Somewhat confusingly, the station in Tommerup Stationsby is referred to as "Tommerup" owing to its earlier opening, whereas the now defunct station in the nearby town of Tommerup was named Knarreborg to avoid ambiguity.
 Tommerup railway station (Tp) in Tommerup Stationsby, transfer to the Funen Main Line
 Knarreborg railway station (Kg) in Tommerup
 Kivsmose Trinbræt (Kmt)
 Nårup railway station (Hp)
 Holtegård Trinbræt (Hgt)
 Glamsbjerg railway station (Gm)
 Koppenbjerg Trinbræt (Kbt)
 Flemløse railway station (Fø)
 Høed Trinbræt (Høt)
 Ebberup railway station (Ep)
 Kærum Billetslagssted (Kjæ)
 Assens (Ac)

References

External links
 Assensbanen on danskejernbaner.dk

1884 establishments in Denmark
Closed railway lines in Denmark
Railway lines closed in 1966
Railway lines opened in 1884